The 2011 Jacksonville Jaguars season was the 17th season in the National Football League for the Jacksonville Jaguars. It began as the 9th under head coach Jack Del Rio, until he was fired on November 29 and replaced on an interim basis by defensive coordinator Mel Tucker. Del Rio finished his tenure in Jacksonville with a 69-73 record in the regular season and 1-2 in the playoffs. He was also just 4 wins shy of surpassing his predecessor, Tom Coughlin as the winningest head coach in Jaguars history. The Jaguars had hoped to improve on their 8–8 record from 2010, but exceeded their loss total in Week 13, and were officially eliminated from postseason contention. With the 10th pick in the 2011 NFL Draft, they selected quarterback Blaine Gabbert from the University of Missouri, and Gabbert would replace Luke McCown as the starting quarterback in Week 3.

The 2011 season saw a dramatic increase in production from the Jaguars defense. This was due in part to off-season acquisitions Dwight Lowery, Dawan Landry, and Drew Coleman in the secondary; linebackers Clint Session and Paul Posluszny; and defensive linemen Matt Roth and John Chick. The development of players such as Terrance Knighton, Tyson Alualu, and Jeremy Mincey also helped improve the pass rush. Even after suffering a multitude of injuries, the Jaguars defense managed to finish with the 6th ranked overall defense in the NFL (The team had finished 28th overall in 2010). Jacksonville's offense, however, was not as efficient. The Jaguars finished last in the NFL in passing yards and total offensive yards gained in 2011.

Offseason

Draft

 The Jaguars acquired this first-round selection in a trade that sent a 2011 first-round and a second-round selection to the Washington Redskins.
 The Jaguars acquired this third-round selection in a trade that sent a 2011 third-round and a sixth-round selection to the San Francisco 49ers.
 The Jaguars acquired this fourth-round selection in a trade that sent a 2010 fifth-round selection to the New Orleans Saints.
The Jaguars traded their seventh-round selection to the Miami Dolphins in exchange for G Justin Smiley.

Preseason

Schedule
The Jaguars' preseason schedule was announced on April 12, 2011.

Regular season

Schedule

Note: Intra-division opponents are in bold text.

Game summaries

Week 1: vs. Tennessee Titans

Week 2: at New York Jets

Week 3: at Carolina Panthers

Week 4: vs. New Orleans Saints

Week 5: vs. Cincinnati Bengals

Week 6: at Pittsburgh Steelers

Week 7: vs. Baltimore Ravens

Week 8: at Houston Texans

Week 10: at Indianapolis Colts

Week 11: at Cleveland Browns

Week 12: vs. Houston Texans

Week 13: vs. San Diego Chargers

Week 14: vs. Tampa Bay Buccaneers

Week 15: at Atlanta Falcons

Week 16: at Tennessee Titans

Week 17: vs. Indianapolis Colts

Standings

Coaching staff

Final roster

Awards and records
 Maurice Jones-Drew, Franchise Record, Most Rushing Yards in One Season (1,606).
 Maurice Jones-Drew, 2011 NFL Rushing Yards Leader.

References

Jacksonville
Jacksonville Jaguars seasons
Jackson